Emrah Başsan (born 17 April 1992) is a Turkish professional footballer who plays as a winger for Kayserispor.

References

External links
 
 
 
 

1992 births
Living people
People from Gebze
Turkish footballers
Turkey under-21 international footballers
Turkey youth international footballers
Pendikspor footballers
Antalyaspor footballers
Çaykur Rizespor footballers
Fortuna Sittard players
Vitória F.C. players
Büyükşehir Belediye Erzurumspor footballers
Kayserispor footballers
Süper Lig players
Eerste Divisie players
Association football midfielders